Ángel de Jesús Camacho Ramírez (born 28 December 2004) is a Mexican Paralympic swimmer.

Early life
Camacho Ramírez was born in León, Guanajuato on 28 December 2004. He studies graphic design at the National College of Professional Technical Education technical high school. He started swimming in 2018 after a swimmer with disabilities advised his father to try it.

Career
He represented Mexico at the 2020 Summer Paralympics, where he won a bronze medal in the 50 meters backstroke S4 event. He also earned two bronze medals at the 2022 World Para Swimming Championships.

References

External links
 Profile at Olympics.com
 Profile at Paralympic.com

2004 births
Living people
Paralympic swimmers of Mexico
People from León, Guanajuato
Swimmers at the 2020 Summer Paralympics
Medalists at the 2019 Parapan American Games
Medalists at the World Para Swimming Championships
Medalists at the 2020 Summer Paralympics
Paralympic bronze medalists for Mexico
Paralympic medalists in swimming
Sportspeople from Guanajuato
Mexican male backstroke swimmers
S4-classified Paralympic swimmers